Gallipolis Ferry is a census-designated place (CDP) in Mason County, West Virginia, United States. It is situated on the Ohio River along West Virginia Route 2. As of the 2010 census, its population was 817. It is the site of the Robert C. Byrd Locks & Dam on the Ohio. The community was named for the fact a ferry once provided service between the town site and nearby  Gallipolis, Ohio.

The community is part of the Point Pleasant, WV–OH Micropolitan Statistical Area.

References

Census-designated places in Mason County, West Virginia
Census-designated places in West Virginia
Point Pleasant micropolitan area
West Virginia populated places on the Ohio River